Double Exposure: The Story of Margaret Bourke-White is a 1989 made-for-television film biography about the life of photographer Margaret Bourke-White. The movie stars Farrah Fawcett as Bourke-White, Frederic Forrest, David Huddleston, Jay Patterson, Mitch Ryan. Portions of the movie were filmed in Lafourche Parish, Louisiana at Laurel Valley Sugar Plantation. Army ROTC members from Nicholls State University served as extras in the film.

Actors
Farrah Fawcett	 as Margaret Bourke-White
Frederic Forrest as Erskine Caldwell
David Huddleston as Bemis
Jay Patterson as Henry Luce
Mitchell Ryan as Patton 
Robert Stanton	 as Lloyd-Smith
Ken Marshall as Chappie

References

External links

1989 television films
1989 films
American television films
Biographical films about photographers
Films about photojournalists
Films directed by Lawrence Schiller